GCP Student Living (Gravis Capital Partners) was a large British investment company dedicated to investments in student accommodation. Established in 2013, it was listed on the London Stock Exchange until December 2021 when it was acquired by funds managed by APG Asset Management and The Blackstone Group. The chairman was Robert Peto.

A consortium backed by funds managed by APG Asset Management and The Blackstone Group made an offer for the company which valued it at £969 million in July 2021. The transaction was sanctioned by the High Court in December 2021.

References

External links

Financial services companies established in 2013
Companies listed on the London Stock Exchange